Aminivibrio is a Gram-negative genus of bacteria from the family of Synergistaceae with one known species (Aminivibrio pyruvatiphilus). Aminivibrio pyruvatiphilus has been isolated from soil from a rice field.

References

Synergistota
Bacteria genera
Monotypic bacteria genera